In mathematics, the Riemann hypothesis is the conjecture that the Riemann zeta function has its zeros only at the negative even integers and complex numbers with real part . Many consider it to be the most important unsolved problem in pure mathematics. It is of great interest in number theory because it implies results about the distribution of prime numbers.

The Riemann hypothesis and some of its generalizations, along with Goldbach's conjecture and the twin prime conjecture, make up Hilbert's eighth problem in David Hilbert's list of twenty-three unsolved problems; it is also one of the Clay Mathematics Institute's Millennium Prize Problems, which offers a million dollars to anyone who solves any of them. The name is also used for some closely related analogues, such as the Riemann hypothesis for curves over finite fields.

The Riemann zeta function ζ(s) is a function whose argument s may be any complex number other than 1, and whose values are also complex. It has zeros at the negative even integers; that is, ζ(s) = 0 when s is one of −2, −4, −6, .... These are called its trivial zeros. The zeta function is also zero for other values of s, which are called nontrivial zeros. The Riemann hypothesis is concerned with the locations of these nontrivial zeros, and states that:

Thus, if the hypothesis is correct, all the nontrivial zeros lie on the critical line consisting of the complex numbers  where t is a real number and i is the imaginary unit.

Riemann zeta function
The Riemann zeta function is defined for complex s with real part greater than 1 by the absolutely convergent infinite series

Leonhard Euler already considered this series in the 1730s for real values of s, in conjunction with his solution to the Basel problem. He also proved that it equals the Euler product

where the infinite product extends over all prime numbers p.

The Riemann hypothesis discusses zeros outside the region of convergence of this series and Euler product. To make sense of the hypothesis, it is necessary to analytically continue the function to obtain a form that is valid for all complex s. Because the zeta function is meromorphic, all choices of how to perform this analytic continuation will lead to the same result, by the identity theorem. A first step in this continuation observes that the series for the zeta function and the Dirichlet eta function satisfy the relation

within the region of convergence for both series. However, the zeta function series on the right converges not just when the real part of s is greater than one, but more generally whenever s has positive real part. These are the points  where  can be any nonzero integer; the zeta function can be extended to these values too by taking limits (see ), giving a finite value for all values of s with positive real part except for the simple pole at s = 1.

In the strip  this extension of the zeta function satisfies the functional equation

One may then define ζ(s) for all remaining nonzero complex numbers s ( and s ≠ 0) by applying this equation outside the strip, and letting ζ(s) equal the right-hand side of the equation whenever s has non-positive real part (and s ≠ 0).

If s is a negative even integer then ζ(s) = 0 because the factor sin(πs/2) vanishes; these are the trivial zeros of the zeta function. (If s is a positive even integer this argument does not apply because the zeros of the sine function are cancelled by the poles of the gamma function as it takes negative integer arguments.)

The value ζ(0) = −1/2 is not determined by the functional equation, but is the limiting value of ζ(s) as s approaches zero. The functional equation also implies that the zeta function has no zeros with negative real part other than the trivial zeros, so all non-trivial zeros lie in the critical strip where s has real part between 0 and 1.

Origin

Riemann's original motivation for studying the zeta function and its zeros was their occurrence in his explicit formula for the number of primes (x) less than or equal to a given number x, which he published in his 1859 paper "On the Number of Primes Less Than a Given Magnitude". His formula was given in terms of the related function

The number of primes can be recovered from this function by using the Möbius inversion formula,

where μ is the Möbius function. Riemann's formula is then

where the sum is over the nontrivial zeros of the zeta function and where Π0 is a slightly modified version of Π that replaces its value at its points of discontinuity by the average of its upper and lower limits:

The summation in Riemann's formula is not absolutely convergent, but may be evaluated by taking the zeros ρ in order of the absolute value of their imaginary part. The function li occurring in the first term is the (unoffset) logarithmic integral function given by the Cauchy principal value of the divergent integral

The other terms also correspond to zeros: the dominant term li(x) comes from the pole at s = 1, considered as a zero of multiplicity −1, and the remaining small terms come from the trivial zeros.

This formula says that the zeros of the Riemann zeta function control the oscillations of primes around their "expected" positions. Riemann knew that the non-trivial zeros of the zeta function were symmetrically distributed about the line  and he knew that all of its non-trivial zeros must lie in the range  He checked that a few of the zeros lay on the critical line with real part 1/2 and suggested that they all do; this is the Riemann hypothesis.

Consequences
The practical uses of the Riemann hypothesis include many propositions known to be true under the Riemann hypothesis, and some that can be shown to be equivalent to the Riemann hypothesis.

Distribution of prime numbers
Riemann's explicit formula for the number of primes less than a given number in terms of a sum over the zeros of the Riemann zeta function says that the magnitude of the oscillations of primes around their expected position is controlled by the real parts of the zeros of the zeta function. In particular the error term in the prime number theorem is closely related to the position of the zeros. For example, if β is the upper bound of the real parts of the zeros, then 

It is already known that 1/2 ≤ β ≤ 1.

Von Koch (1901) proved that the Riemann hypothesis implies the "best possible" bound for the error of the prime number theorem.

 also showed that the Riemann hypothesis implies

where  is Chebyshev's second function.

 proved that the Riemann hypothesis implies that for all  there is a prime  satisfying
. 
This is an explicit version of a theorem of Cramér.

Growth of arithmetic functions
The Riemann hypothesis implies strong bounds on the growth of many other arithmetic functions, in addition to the primes counting function above.

One example involves the Möbius function μ. The statement that the equation

is valid for every s with real part greater than 1/2, with the sum on the right hand side converging, is equivalent to the Riemann hypothesis. From this we can also conclude that if the Mertens function is defined by

then the claim that

for every positive ε is equivalent to the Riemann hypothesis (J.E. Littlewood, 1912; see for instance: paragraph 14.25 in ). (For the meaning of these symbols, see Big O notation.) The determinant of the order n Redheffer matrix is equal to M(n), so the Riemann hypothesis can also be stated as a condition on the growth of these determinants. Littlewood's result has been improved several times since then, by Edmund Landau, Edward Charles Titchmarsh, Helmut Maier and Hugh Montgomery, and Kannan Soundararajan.  Soundararajan's result is that

The Riemann hypothesis puts a rather tight bound on the growth of M, since  disproved the slightly stronger Mertens conjecture

The Riemann hypothesis is equivalent to many other conjectures about the rate of growth of other arithmetic functions aside from μ(n). A typical example is Robin's theorem, which states that if σ(n) is the sigma function, given by

then

for all n > 5040 if and only if the Riemann hypothesis is true, where γ is the Euler–Mascheroni constant.

A related bound was given by Jeffrey Lagarias in 2002, who proved that the Riemann hypothesis is equivalent to the statement that:

for every natural number n > 1, where  is the nth harmonic number.

The Riemann hypothesis is also true if and only if the inequality

is true for all n ≥ p120569# where φ(n) is Euler's totient function and p120569# is the product of the first 120569 primes.

Another example was found by Jérôme Franel, and extended by Landau (see ). The Riemann hypothesis is equivalent to several statements showing that the terms of the Farey sequence are fairly regular. One such equivalence is as follows: if Fn is the Farey sequence of order n, beginning with 1/n and up to 1/1, then the claim that for all ε > 0

is equivalent to the Riemann hypothesis. Here

is the number of terms in the Farey sequence of order n.

For an example from group theory, if g(n) is Landau's function given by the maximal order of elements of the symmetric group Sn of degree n, then  showed that the Riemann hypothesis is equivalent to the bound

for all sufficiently large n.

Lindelöf hypothesis and growth of the zeta function
The Riemann hypothesis has various weaker consequences as well; one is the Lindelöf hypothesis on the rate of growth of the zeta function on the critical line, which says that, for any ε > 0,

The Riemann hypothesis also implies quite sharp bounds for the growth rate of the zeta function in other regions of the critical strip. For example, it implies that

so the growth rate of ζ(1+it) and its inverse would be known up to a factor of 2.

Large prime gap conjecture
The prime number theorem implies that on average, the gap between the prime p and its successor is log p. However, some gaps between primes may be much larger than the average. Cramér proved that, assuming the Riemann hypothesis, every gap is O( log p). This is a case in which even the best bound that can be proved using the Riemann hypothesis is far weaker than what seems true: Cramér's conjecture implies that every gap is O((log p)2), which, while larger than the average gap, is far smaller than the bound implied by the Riemann hypothesis. Numerical evidence supports Cramér's conjecture.

Analytic criteria equivalent to the Riemann hypothesis
Many statements equivalent to the Riemann hypothesis have been found, though so far none of them have led to much progress in proving (or disproving) it. Some typical examples are as follows. (Others involve the divisor function σ(n).)

holds for all ε > 0 if and only if the Riemann hypothesis holds. See also the Hardy–Littlewood criterion.

 proved that the Riemann hypothesis is true if and only if the space of functions of the form

where ρ(z) is the fractional part of z, and

,

is dense in the Hilbert space L2(0,1) of square-integrable functions on the unit interval.  extended this by showing that the zeta function has no zeros with real part greater than 1/p if and only if this function space is dense in Lp(0,1). This Nyman-Beurling criterion was strengthened by Baez-Duarte  to the case where .

 showed that the Riemann hypothesis is true if and only if the integral equation

Weil's criterion is the statement that the positivity of a certain function is equivalent to the Riemann hypothesis. Related is Li's criterion, a statement that the positivity of a certain sequence of numbers is equivalent to the Riemann hypothesis.

That  has only simple zeros on the critical line is equivalent to its derivative having no zeros on the critical line.

The Farey sequence provides two equivalences, due to Jerome Franel and Edmund Landau in 1924.

The De Bruijn–Newman constant denoted by Λ and named after Nicolaas Govert de Bruijn and Charles M. Newman, is defined
as the unique real number such that the function

,

that is parametrised by a real parameter λ, has a complex variable z and is defined using a super-exponentially decaying function

.

has only real zeros if and only if λ ≥ Λ.
Since the Riemann hypothesis is equivalent to the claim that all the zeroes of H(0, z) are real, the Riemann hypothesis is equivalent to the conjecture that . Brad Rodgers and Terence Tao discovered the equivalence is actually  by proving zero to be the lower bound of the constant. Proving zero is also the upper bound would therefore prove the Riemann hypothesis.

Consequences of the generalized Riemann hypothesis
Several applications use the generalized Riemann hypothesis for Dirichlet L-series or zeta functions of number fields rather than just the Riemann hypothesis. Many basic properties of the Riemann zeta function can easily be generalized to all Dirichlet L-series, so it is plausible that a method that proves the Riemann hypothesis for the Riemann zeta function would also work for the generalized Riemann hypothesis for Dirichlet L-functions. Several results first proved using the generalized Riemann hypothesis were later given unconditional proofs without using it, though these were usually much harder.
 In 1913, Grönwall showed that the generalized Riemann hypothesis implies that Gauss's list of imaginary quadratic fields with class number 1 is complete, though Baker, Stark and Heegner later gave unconditional proofs of this without using the generalized Riemann hypothesis.
 In 1917, Hardy and Littlewood showed that the generalized Riemann hypothesis implies a conjecture of Chebyshev that  which says that primes 3 mod 4 are more common than primes 1 mod 4 in some sense. (For related results, see .)
 In 1923, Hardy and Littlewood showed that the generalized Riemann hypothesis implies a weak form of the Goldbach conjecture for odd numbers: that every sufficiently large odd number is the sum of three primes, though in 1937 Vinogradov gave an unconditional proof. In 1997 Deshouillers, Effinger, te Riele, and Zinoviev showed that the generalized Riemann hypothesis implies that every odd number greater than 5 is the sum of three primes. In 2013 Harald Helfgott proved the ternary Goldbach conjecture without the GRH dependence, subject to some extensive calculations completed with the help of David J. Platt.
 In 1934, Chowla showed that the generalized Riemann hypothesis implies that the first prime in the arithmetic progression a mod m is at most Km2log(m)2 for some fixed constant K.
 In 1967, Hooley showed that the generalized Riemann hypothesis implies Artin's conjecture on primitive roots.
 In 1973, Weinberger showed that the generalized Riemann hypothesis implies that Euler's list of idoneal numbers is complete.
  showed that the generalized Riemann hypothesis for the zeta functions of all algebraic number fields implies that any number field with class number 1 is either Euclidean or an imaginary quadratic number field of discriminant −19, −43, −67, or −163.
 In 1976, G. Miller showed that the generalized Riemann hypothesis implies that one can test if a number is prime in polynomial time via the Miller test. In 2002, Manindra Agrawal, Neeraj Kayal and Nitin Saxena proved this result unconditionally using the AKS primality test.
  discussed how the generalized Riemann hypothesis can be used to give sharper estimates for discriminants and class numbers of number fields.
  showed that the generalized Riemann hypothesis implies that Ramanujan's integral quadratic form  represents all integers that it represents locally, with exactly 18 exceptions.
 In 2021, Alexander (Alex) Dunn and Maksym Radziwill proved Patterson's conjecture under the assumption of the GRH.

Excluded middle
Some consequences of the RH are also consequences of its negation, and are thus theorems. In their discussion of the Hecke, Deuring, Mordell, Heilbronn theorem,  say

The method of proof here is truly amazing. If the generalized Riemann  hypothesis is true, then the theorem is true. If the generalized Riemann  hypothesis is false, then the theorem is true. Thus, the theorem is true!!     (punctuation in original)

Care should be taken to understand what is meant by saying the generalized Riemann hypothesis is false: one should specify exactly which class of Dirichlet series has a counterexample.

Littlewood's theorem
This concerns the sign of the error in the prime number theorem.
It has been computed that π(x) < li(x) for all x ≤ 1025 (see this table), and no value of x is known for which π(x) > li(x).

In 1914 Littlewood proved that there are arbitrarily large values of x for which

and that there are also arbitrarily large values of x for which

Thus the difference π(x) − li(x) changes sign infinitely many times. Skewes' number is an estimate of the value of x corresponding to the first sign change.

Littlewood's proof is divided into two cases: the RH is assumed false (about half a page of ), and the RH is assumed true (about a dozen pages).  followed this up with a paper on the number of times  changes sign in the interval .

Gauss's class number conjecture
This is the conjecture (first stated in article 303 of Gauss's Disquisitiones Arithmeticae) that there are only finitely many imaginary quadratic fields with a given class number. One way to prove it would be to show that as the discriminant  the class number .

The following sequence of theorems involving the Riemann hypothesis is described in :

(In the work of Hecke and Heilbronn, the only L-functions that occur are those attached to imaginary quadratic characters, and it is only for those L-functions that GRH is true or GRH is false is intended; a failure of GRH for the L-function of a cubic Dirichlet character would, strictly speaking, mean GRH is false, but that was not the kind of failure of GRH that Heilbronn had in mind, so his assumption was more restricted than simply GRH is false.)

In 1935, Carl Siegel later strengthened the result without using RH or GRH in any way.

Growth of Euler's totient
In 1983 J. L. Nicolas proved that

for infinitely many n, where φ(n) is Euler's totient function and γ is Euler's constant. Ribenboim remarks that: "The method of proof is interesting, in that the inequality is shown first under the assumption that the Riemann hypothesis is true, secondly under the contrary assumption."

Generalizations and analogs

Dirichlet L-series and other number fields
The Riemann hypothesis can be generalized by replacing the Riemann zeta function by the formally similar, but much more general, global L-functions. In this broader setting, one expects the non-trivial zeros of the global L-functions to have real part 1/2. It is these conjectures, rather than the classical Riemann hypothesis only for the single Riemann zeta function, which account for the true importance of the Riemann hypothesis in mathematics.

The generalized Riemann hypothesis extends the Riemann hypothesis to all Dirichlet L-functions. In particular it implies the conjecture that Siegel zeros (zeros of L-functions between 1/2 and 1) do not exist.

The extended Riemann hypothesis extends the Riemann hypothesis to all Dedekind zeta functions of algebraic number fields. The extended Riemann hypothesis for abelian extension of the rationals is equivalent to the generalized Riemann hypothesis. The Riemann hypothesis can also be extended to the L-functions of Hecke characters of number fields.

The grand Riemann hypothesis extends it to all automorphic zeta functions, such as Mellin transforms of Hecke eigenforms.

Function fields and zeta functions of varieties over finite fields
For instance, the fact that the Gauss sum, of the quadratic character of a finite field of size q (with q odd), has absolute value  is actually an instance of the Riemann hypothesis in the function field setting.

Arithmetic zeta functions of arithmetic schemes and their L-factors
Arithmetic zeta functions generalise the Riemann and Dedekind zeta functions as well as the zeta functions of varieties over finite fields to every arithmetic scheme or a scheme of finite type over integers. The arithmetic zeta function of a regular connected equidimensional arithmetic scheme of Kronecker dimension n can be factorized into the product of appropriately defined L-factors and an auxiliary factor . Assuming a functional equation and meromorphic continuation, the generalized Riemann hypothesis for the L-factor states that its zeros inside the critical strip  lie on the central line. Correspondingly, the generalized Riemann hypothesis for the arithmetic zeta function of a regular connected equidimensional arithmetic scheme states that its zeros inside the critical strip  lie on vertical lines  and its poles inside the critical strip lie on  vertical lines .

Selberg zeta functions

 introduced the Selberg zeta function of a Riemann surface. These are similar to the Riemann zeta function: they have a functional equation, and an infinite product similar to the Euler product but taken over closed geodesics rather than primes. The Selberg trace formula is the analogue for these functions of the explicit formulas in prime number theory. Selberg proved that the Selberg zeta functions satisfy the analogue of the Riemann hypothesis, with the imaginary parts of their zeros related to the eigenvalues of the Laplacian operator of the Riemann surface.

Ihara zeta functions
The Ihara zeta function of a finite graph is an analogue of the Selberg zeta function, which was first introduced by Yasutaka Ihara in the context of discrete subgroups of the two-by-two p-adic special linear group. A regular finite graph is a Ramanujan graph, a mathematical model of efficient communication networks, if and only if its Ihara zeta function satisfies the analogue of the Riemann hypothesis as was pointed out by T. Sunada.

Montgomery's pair correlation conjecture
 suggested the pair correlation conjecture that the correlation functions of the (suitably normalized) zeros of the zeta function should be the same as those of the eigenvalues of a random hermitian matrix.  showed that this is supported by large-scale numerical calculations of these correlation functions.

Montgomery showed that (assuming the Riemann hypothesis) at least 2/3 of all zeros are simple, and a related conjecture is that all zeros of the zeta function are simple (or more generally have no non-trivial integer linear relations between their imaginary parts). Dedekind zeta functions of algebraic number fields, which generalize the Riemann zeta function, often do have multiple complex zeros. This is because the Dedekind zeta functions factorize as a product of powers of Artin L-functions, so zeros of Artin L-functions sometimes give rise to multiple zeros of Dedekind zeta functions. Other examples of zeta functions with multiple zeros are the L-functions of some elliptic curves: these can have multiple zeros at the real point of their critical line; the Birch-Swinnerton-Dyer conjecture predicts that the multiplicity of this zero is the rank of the elliptic curve.

Other zeta functions
There are many other examples of zeta functions with analogues of the Riemann hypothesis, some of which have been proved. The main conjecture of Iwasawa theory, proved by Barry Mazur and Andrew Wiles for cyclotomic fields, and Wiles for totally real fields, identifies the zeros of a p-adic L-function with the eigenvalues of an operator, so can be thought of as an analogue of the Hilbert–Pólya conjecture for p-adic L-functions.

Attempted proofs
Several mathematicians have addressed the Riemann hypothesis, but none of their attempts has yet been accepted as a proof.  lists some incorrect solutions.

Operator theory

Hilbert and Pólya suggested that one way to derive the Riemann hypothesis would be to find a self-adjoint operator, from the existence of which the statement on the real parts of the zeros of ζ(s) would follow when one applies the criterion on real eigenvalues. Some support for this idea comes from several analogues of the Riemann zeta functions whose zeros correspond to eigenvalues of some operator: the zeros of a zeta function of a variety over a finite field correspond to eigenvalues of a Frobenius element on an étale cohomology group, the zeros of a Selberg zeta function are eigenvalues of a Laplacian operator of a Riemann surface, and the zeros of a p-adic zeta function correspond to eigenvectors of a Galois action on ideal class groups.

 showed that the distribution of the zeros of the Riemann zeta function shares some statistical properties with the eigenvalues of random matrices drawn from the Gaussian unitary ensemble. This gives some support to the Hilbert–Pólya conjecture.

In 1999, Michael Berry and Jonathan Keating conjectured that there is some unknown quantization  of the classical Hamiltonian H = xp so that

and even more strongly, that the Riemann zeros coincide with the spectrum of the operator . This is in contrast to canonical quantization, which leads to the Heisenberg uncertainty principle  and the natural numbers as spectrum of the quantum harmonic oscillator. The crucial point is that the Hamiltonian should be a self-adjoint operator so that the quantization would be a realization of the Hilbert–Pólya program. In a connection with this quantum mechanical problem Berry and Connes had proposed that the inverse of the potential of the Hamiltonian is connected to the half-derivative of the function

then, in Berry–Connes approach

This yields a Hamiltonian whose eigenvalues are the square of the imaginary part of the Riemann zeros, and also that the functional determinant of this Hamiltonian operator is just the Riemann Xi function. In fact the Riemann Xi function would be proportional to the functional determinant (Hadamard product)

as proved by Connes and others, in this approach

The analogy with the Riemann hypothesis over finite fields suggests that the Hilbert space containing eigenvectors corresponding to the zeros might be some sort of first cohomology group of the spectrum Spec (Z) of the integers.  described some of the attempts to find such a cohomology theory.

 constructed a natural space of invariant functions on the upper half plane that has eigenvalues under the Laplacian operator that correspond to zeros of the Riemann zeta function—and remarked that in the unlikely event that one could show the existence of a suitable positive definite inner product on this space, the Riemann hypothesis would follow.  discussed a related example, where due to a bizarre bug a computer program listed zeros of the Riemann zeta function as eigenvalues of the same Laplacian operator.

 surveyed some of the attempts to construct a suitable physical model related to the Riemann zeta function.

Lee–Yang theorem 
The Lee–Yang theorem states that the zeros of certain partition functions in statistical mechanics all lie on a "critical line" with their real part equals to 0, and this has led to some speculation about a relationship with the Riemann hypothesis.

Turán's result
 showed that if the functions

have no zeros when the real part of s is greater than one then

where λ(n) is the Liouville function given by (−1)r if n has r prime factors. He showed that this in turn would imply that the Riemann hypothesis is true. Therefore, Turán's result is vacuously true and cannot help prove the Riemann hypothesis.

Noncommutative geometry
 has described a relationship between the Riemann hypothesis and noncommutative geometry, and showed that a suitable analog of the Selberg trace formula for the action of the idèle class group on the adèle class space would imply the Riemann hypothesis.

Hilbert spaces of entire functions
 showed that the Riemann hypothesis would follow from a positivity condition on a certain Hilbert space of entire functions.
However  showed that the necessary positivity conditions are not satisfied. Despite this obstacle, de Branges has continued to work on an attempted proof of the Riemann hypothesis along the same lines, but this has not been widely accepted by other mathematicians.

Quasicrystals
The Riemann hypothesis implies that the zeros of the zeta function form a quasicrystal, a distribution with discrete support whose Fourier transform also has discrete support.
 suggested trying to prove the Riemann hypothesis by classifying, or at least studying, 1-dimensional quasicrystals.

Arithmetic zeta functions of models of elliptic curves over number fields
When one goes from geometric dimension one, e.g. an algebraic number field, to geometric dimension two, e.g. a regular model of an elliptic curve over a number field, the two-dimensional part of the generalized Riemann hypothesis for the arithmetic zeta function of the model deals with the poles of the zeta function. In dimension one the study of the zeta integral in Tate's thesis does not lead to new important information on the Riemann hypothesis. Contrary to this, in dimension two work of Ivan Fesenko on two-dimensional generalisation of Tate's thesis includes an integral representation of a zeta integral closely related to the zeta function. In this new situation, not possible in dimension one, the poles of the zeta function can be studied via the zeta integral and associated adele groups.

Multiple zeta functions
Deligne's proof of the Riemann hypothesis over finite fields used the zeta functions of product varieties, whose zeros and poles correspond to sums of zeros and poles of the original zeta function, in order to bound the real parts of the zeros of the original zeta function. By analogy,  introduced multiple zeta functions whose zeros and poles correspond to sums of zeros and poles of the Riemann zeta function. To make the series converge he restricted to sums of zeros or poles all with non-negative imaginary part. So far, the known bounds on the zeros and poles of the multiple zeta functions are not strong enough to give useful estimates for the zeros of the Riemann zeta function.

Location of the zeros

Number of zeros
The functional equation combined with the argument principle implies that the number of zeros of the zeta function with imaginary part between 0 and T is given by

for s=1/2+iT, where the argument is defined by varying it continuously along the line with Im(s)=T, starting with argument 0 at ∞+iT. This is the sum of a large but well understood term

and a small but rather mysterious term

So the density of zeros with imaginary part near T is about log(T)/2π, and the function S describes the small deviations from this. The function S(t) jumps by 1 at each zero of the zeta function, and for  it decreases monotonically between zeros with derivative close to −log t.

 proved that, if , then
.

Karatsuba (1996) proved that every interval (T, T+H] for  contains at least
 
points where the function S(t) changes sign.

 showed that the average moments of even powers of S are given by

This suggests that S(T)/(log log T)1/2 resembles a Gaussian random variable with mean 0 and variance 2π2 ( proved this fact).
In particular |S(T)| is usually somewhere around (log log T)1/2, but occasionally much larger. The exact order of growth of S(T) is not known. There has been no unconditional improvement to Riemann's original bound S(T)=O(log T), though the Riemann hypothesis implies the slightly smaller bound S(T)=O(log T/log log T). The true order of magnitude may be somewhat less than this, as random functions with the same distribution as S(T) tend to have growth of order about log(T)1/2. In the other direction it cannot be too small:  showed that , and assuming the Riemann hypothesis Montgomery showed that .

Riemann's estimate S(T) = O(log T) implies that the gaps between zeros are bounded, and Littlewood improved this slightly, showing that the gaps between their imaginary parts tend to 0.

Theorem of Hadamard and de la Vallée-Poussin
 and  independently proved that no zeros could lie on the line Re(s) = 1. Together with the functional equation and the fact that there are no zeros with real part greater than 1, this showed that all non-trivial zeros must lie in the interior of the critical strip . This was a key step in their first proofs of the prime number theorem.

Both the original proofs that the zeta function has no zeros with real part 1 are similar, and depend on showing that if ζ(1+it) vanishes, then ζ(1+2it) is singular, which is not possible. One way of doing this is by using the inequality

for σ > 1, t real, and looking at the limit as σ → 1. This inequality follows by taking the real part of the log of the Euler product to see that

where the sum is over all prime powers pn, so that

which is at least 1 because all the terms in the sum are positive, due to the inequality

Zero-free regions
Beyond that zero-free regions are known as inequalities concerning , which can be zeroes. The oldest version is from De la Vallée-Poussin (1899–1900), who proved there is a region without zeroes that satisfies  for some positive constant C. In other words, zeros cannot be too close to the line  there is a zero-free region close to this line. This has been enlarged by several authors using methods such as Vinogradov's mean-value theorem.

The most recent paper by Mossinghoff, Trudgian and Yang is from December 2022 and provides four zero-free regions that improved the previous results of Kevin Ford from 2002, Mossinghoff and Trudgian themselves from 2015 and Pace Nielsen's slight improvement of Ford from October 2022:

  whenever ,
  whenever  (largest known region in the bound ),
  whenever  (largest known region in the bound ) and
  whenever  (largest known region in its own bound)

The paper also has a improvement to the second zero-free region, whose bounds are unknown on account of  being merely assumed to be "sufficiently large" to fulfill the requirements of the paper's proof. This region is

.

Zeros on the critical line
 and  showed there are infinitely many zeros on the critical line, by considering moments of certain functions related to the zeta function.  proved that at least a (small) positive proportion of zeros lie on the line.  improved this to one-third of the zeros by relating the zeros of the zeta function to those of its derivative, and  improved this further to two-fifths. In 2020, this estimate was extended to five-twelfths by Pratt, Robles, Zaharescu and Zeindler by considering extended mollifiers that can accommodate higher order derivatives of the zeta function and their associated Kloosterman sums.

Most zeros lie close to the critical line.

Hardy–Littlewood conjectures
In 1914 Godfrey Harold Hardy proved that  has infinitely many real zeros.

Let  be the total number of real zeros, and  be the total number of zeros of odd order of the function  lying on the interval .

Selberg's zeta function conjecture

The estimates of Selberg and Karatsuba can not be improved in respect of the order of growth as T → ∞.

 proved that an analog of the Selberg conjecture holds for almost all intervals (T, T+H], where ε is an arbitrarily small fixed positive number. The Karatsuba method permits to investigate zeros of the Riemann zeta function on "supershort" intervals of the critical line, that is, on the intervals (T, T+H], the length H of which grows slower than any, even arbitrarily small degree T. In particular, he proved that for any given numbers ε,  satisfying the conditions  almost all intervals (T, T+H] for  contain at least  zeros of the function . This estimate is quite close to the one that follows from the Riemann hypothesis.

Numerical calculations
The function

has the same zeros as the zeta function in the critical strip, and is real on the critical line because of the functional equation, so one can prove the existence of zeros exactly on the real line between two points by checking numerically that the function has opposite signs at these points. Usually one writes

where Hardy's Z function and the Riemann–Siegel theta function θ are uniquely defined by this and the condition that they are smooth real functions with θ(0)=0.
By finding many intervals where the function Z changes sign one can show that there are many zeros on the critical line. To verify the Riemann hypothesis up to a given imaginary part T of the zeros, one also has to check that there are no further zeros off the line in this region. This can be done by calculating the total number of zeros in the region using Turing's method and checking that it is the same as the number of zeros found on the line. This allows one to verify the Riemann hypothesis computationally up to any desired value of T (provided all the zeros of the zeta function in this region are simple and on the critical line).

Some calculations of zeros of the zeta function are listed below, where the "height" of a zero is the magnitude of its imaginary part, and the height of the nth zero is denoted by γn. So far all zeros that have been checked are on the critical line and are simple. (A multiple zero would cause problems for the zero finding algorithms, which depend on finding sign changes between zeros.)

Gram points
A Gram point is a point on the critical line 1/2 + it where the zeta function is real and non-zero. Using the expression for the zeta function on the critical line, ζ(1/2 + it) = Z(t)e − iθ(t), where Hardy's function, Z, is real for real t, and θ is the Riemann–Siegel theta function, we see that zeta is real when sin(θ(t)) = 0. This implies that θ(t) is an integer multiple of π, which allows for the location of Gram points to be calculated fairly easily by inverting the formula for θ. They are usually numbered as gn for n = 0, 1, ..., where gn is the unique solution of θ(t) = nπ.

Gram observed that there was often exactly one zero of the zeta function between any two Gram points; Hutchinson called this observation Gram's law. There are several other closely related statements that are also sometimes called Gram's law: for example, (−1)nZ(gn) is usually positive, or Z(t) usually has opposite sign at consecutive Gram points. The imaginary parts γn of the first few zeros (in blue) and the first few Gram points gn are given in the following table

 The first failure of Gram's law occurs at the 127th zero and the Gram point g126, which are in the "wrong" order.

A Gram point t is called good if the zeta function is positive at 1/2 + it. The indices of the "bad" Gram points where Z has the "wrong" sign are 126, 134, 195, 211, ... . A Gram block is an interval bounded by two good Gram points such that all the Gram points between them are bad. A refinement of Gram's law called Rosser's rule due to  says that Gram blocks often have the expected number of zeros in them (the same as the number of Gram intervals), even though some of the individual Gram intervals in the block may not have exactly one zero in them. For example, the interval bounded by g125 and g127 is a Gram block containing a unique bad Gram point g126, and contains the expected number 2 of zeros although neither of its two Gram intervals contains a unique zero. Rosser et al. checked that there were no exceptions to Rosser's rule in the first 3 million zeros, although there are infinitely many exceptions to Rosser's rule over the entire zeta function.

Gram's rule and Rosser's rule both say that in some sense zeros do not stray too far from their expected positions. The distance of a zero from its expected position is controlled by the function S defined above, which grows extremely slowly: its average value is of the order of (log log T)1/2, which only reaches 2 for T around 1024. This means that both rules hold most of the time for small T but eventually break down often. Indeed,  showed that both Gram's law and Rosser's rule fail in a positive proportion of cases. To be specific, it is expected that in about 66% one zero is enclosed by two successive Gram points, but in 17% no zero and in 17% two zeros are in such a Gram-interval on the long run .

Arguments for and against the Riemann hypothesis
Mathematical papers about the Riemann hypothesis tend to be cautiously noncommittal about its truth. The consensus of the survey articles (and ) is that the evidence for it is strong but not overwhelming, so that while it is probably true there is reasonable doubt.

 Several analogues of the Riemann hypothesis have already been proved. This provides some evidence for the more general conjecture that all zeta functions associated with automorphic forms satisfy a Riemann hypothesis, which includes the classical Riemann hypothesis as a special case. Similarly Selberg zeta functions satisfy the analogue of the Riemann hypothesis, and are in some ways similar to the Riemann zeta function, having a functional equation and an infinite product expansion analogous to the Euler product expansion. But there are also some major differences; for example, they are not given by Dirichlet series. In contrast to these positive examples, some Epstein zeta functions do not satisfy the Riemann hypothesis even though they have an infinite number of zeros on the critical line. These functions are quite similar to the Riemann zeta function, and have a Dirichlet series expansion and a functional equation, but the ones known to fail the Riemann hypothesis do not have an Euler product and are not directly related to automorphic representations.
 At first, the numerical verification that many zeros lie on the line seems strong evidence for it. But analytic number theory has had many conjectures supported by substantial numerical evidence that turned out to be false. See Skewes number for a notorious example, where the first exception to a plausible conjecture related to the Riemann hypothesis probably occurs around 10316; a counterexample to the Riemann hypothesis with imaginary part this size would be far beyond anything that can currently be computed using a direct approach. The problem is that the behavior is often influenced by very slowly increasing functions such as log log T, that tend to infinity, but do so so slowly that this cannot be detected by computation. Such functions occur in the theory of the zeta function controlling the behavior of its zeros; for example the function S(T) above has average size around (log log T)1/2. As S(T) jumps by at least 2 at any counterexample to the Riemann hypothesis, one might expect any counterexamples to the Riemann hypothesis to start appearing only when S(T) becomes large. It is never much more than 3 as far as it has been calculated, but is known to be unbounded, suggesting that calculations may not have yet reached the region of typical behavior of the zeta function.
 Denjoy's probabilistic argument for the Riemann hypothesis is based on the observation that if μ(x) is a random sequence of "1"s and "−1"s then, for every , the partial sums  (the values of which are positions in a simple random walk) satisfy the bound  with probability 1. The Riemann hypothesis is equivalent to this bound for the Möbius function μ and the Mertens function M derived in the same way from it. In other words, the Riemann hypothesis is in some sense equivalent to saying that μ(x) behaves like a random sequence of coin tosses. When μ(x) is nonzero its sign gives the parity of the number of prime factors of x, so informally the Riemann hypothesis says that the parity of the number of prime factors of an integer behaves randomly. Such probabilistic arguments in number theory often give the right answer, but tend to be very hard to make rigorous, and occasionally give the wrong answer for some results, such as Maier's theorem.
 The calculations in  show that the zeros of the zeta function behave very much like the eigenvalues of a random Hermitian matrix, suggesting that they are the eigenvalues of some self-adjoint operator, which would imply the Riemann hypothesis. All attempts to find such an operator have failed.
 There are several theorems, such as Goldbach's weak conjecture for sufficiently large odd numbers, that were first proved using the generalized Riemann hypothesis, and later shown to be true unconditionally. This could be considered as weak evidence for the generalized Riemann hypothesis, as several of its "predictions" are true.
 Lehmer's phenomenon, where two zeros are sometimes very close, is sometimes given as a reason to disbelieve the Riemann hypothesis. But one would expect this to happen occasionally by chance even if the Riemann hypothesis is true, and Odlyzko's calculations suggest that nearby pairs of zeros occur just as often as predicted by Montgomery's conjecture.
 Patterson suggests that the most compelling reason for the Riemann hypothesis for most mathematicians is the hope that primes are distributed as regularly as possible.

Notes

References

 
 
 
 
 
 
 
 
 
 
 
 
 

 
 
 
 
 
 
 
 
 
 
 
 
 
 
 
 
  Review
 
 . Reprinted 1990, 
 
  (Reprinted by Dover 2003)
 

 
 

 
 
 
 
 
 
.
 
 
 
 

 
 .
 .
 
 
 
 
  This unpublished book describes the implementation of the algorithm and discusses the results in detail.
 
 
 
 

 
 . In Gesammelte Werke, Teubner, Leipzig (1892), Reprinted by Dover, New York (1953). Original manuscript (with English translation).
 
 
 
 ; see also announcement on Tao's blog, January 19, 2018
 
 
 
 

 
 
 
 
 
  Reprinted in Gesammelte Abhandlungen, Vol. 1. Berlin: Springer-Verlag, 1966.
 
 
 
 
 
 
 
 
 
 
 
 
  Reprinted in Oeuvres Scientifiques/Collected Papers by Andre Weil

Popular expositions
 
 
 
 
 
 
 Frenkel, Edward (2014), The Riemann Hypothesis Numberphile, Mar 11, 2014 (video)

External links

 American institute of mathematics, Riemann hypothesis
 Zeroes database, 103 800 788 359 zeroes
 The Key to the Riemann Hypothesis - Numberphile, a YouTube video about the Riemann hypothesis by Numberphile
  Poem about the Riemann hypothesis, sung by John Derbyshire.
  (Slides for a lecture)
 
 
  (Reviews the GUE hypothesis, provides an extensive bibliography as well).
  including papers on the zeros of the zeta function and tables of the zeros of the zeta function
  Slides of a talk
 . A discussion of Xavier Gourdon's calculation of the first ten trillion non-trivial zeros
 
 .
 
 
 , a simple animated Java applet.
 
 Zetagrid (2002) A distributed computing project that attempted to disprove Riemann's hypothesis; closed in November 2005

1859 introductions
Analytic number theory
Bernhard Riemann
Conjectures
Hilbert's problems
Hypotheses
Millennium Prize Problems
Unsolved problems in number theory
Zeta and L-functions